Global Commerce Initiative 
Global Film Initiative
Global Health Initiatives
Global Health Security Initiative
Global Health Share Initiative
Global Initiative Against Transnational Organized Crime
Global Initiative for Asthma
Global Initiative for Emergency and Essential Surgical Care
Global Initiative for Traditional Systems of Health
Global Initiative on Psychiatry
Global Initiative on Sharing Avian Influenza Data
Global Initiative to Combat Nuclear Terrorism
Global Marshall Plan Initiative
Global Methane Initiative
Global Network Initiative
Global Peatlands Initiative
Global Polio Eradication Initiative
Global Reporting Initiative
Globally Responsible Leadership Initiative
Guggenheim UBS MAP Global Art Initiative
Human Rights Accountability Global Initiative
No Pain Labor & Delivery - Global Health Initiative
Office of Global Women's Issues
RNAi Global Initiative
United Nations Global Compact
Waterloo Global Science Initiative